State Route 243 (SR 243) is a  north-south state highway in Maury County, Tennessee. It connects Mount Pleasant with Columbia, while also providing access to Maury County Airport.

Route description

SR 243 begins at the southern edge of Mount Pleasant at an intersection with US 43/SR 6. It heads northeast along Main Street to become concurrent with SR 166 before passing through downtown, where SR 166 splits off and heads west. The highway then passes through before crossing a creek and passing by some businesses and the Maury County Airport, where it has an interchange with US 43/SR 6. SR 243 begins passing through rural areas and the community of Ashwood, where it has an intersection with Zion Road (connector to US 43), and crosses into the Columbia city limits as Trotwood Avenue. It continues northeast to pass through neighborhoods before coming to an intersection with SR 50. The highway then passes through mix of neighborhoods and businesses before coming to an end at an intersection with US 412 Business/SR 99. The entire route of SR 243 is a two-lane highway.

History

The entire route of SR 243 represents the former two-lane alignment of US 43 between Mount Pleasant and Columbia.

Major intersections

References

243
Transportation in Maury County, Tennessee
Columbia, Tennessee
U.S. Route 43